Demons & Wizards was a power metal band conceived as a side-project by Blind Guardian vocalist Hansi Kürsch and Jon Schaffer, the guitarist for Iced Earth. Schaffer wrote the music and Kürsch wrote the lyrics. The band's line-up during the recording of their first album in 1999 (Demons & Wizards) featured Mark Prator, who was the drummer on a few Iced Earth albums, and Jim Morris, who has engineered for Iced Earth before, on lead guitar. The personnel for the second album (Touched by the Crimson King), released in 2005, included Morris on lead guitar and Bobby Jarzombek on drums. The band released a third studio album, III, in 2020, and disbanded in early 2021.

Biography

Band name
The original goal of the band was to forge the different musical styles of both Iced Earth's dark melodies and Blind Guardian's powerful vocals into one sound. In fact, according to the musicians, the band name is meant to describe the two styles: the self-proclaimed demon-like themes and sounds of Iced Earth and wizard-like themes and sounds of Blind Guardian (the moniker "Demons & Wizards" was inspired by Schaffer's wife always referring to him and Hansi as "Demons and Angels". Hansi always corrected her, since he claims to "not be at all angelic", and that it is more properly stated "Demons and Wizards", in reference to Uriah Heep's album of the same name). The band met with a fair deal of commercial success, though not as much as either of their individual bands.

The idea for the band arose in the spring of 1997 when Kürsch and Schaffer wanted to make music together, after being friends for several years.

Album information
The band's first full-length release was in 2000, with the self-titled album Demons & Wizards. In 2005, the band released their second album entitled Touched by the Crimson King. Touched by the Crimson King is partially based on The Dark Tower series of books (written by Stephen King), in which the Crimson King is the main antagonist.

Recent activity, touring, and third studio album

In a March 2009 interview, when asked about what projects he would be working on after taking a vacation, guitarist Jon Schaffer stated:

On March 15, 2011, singer Hansi Kürsch posted an update on the official Blind Guardian website, containing the following news:

On February 13, 2015, in an interview when asked about Demons & Wizards and his relationship with Jon Schaffer, Kürsch replied:

On May 15, 2017, Schaffer confirmed in an interview with Metal Wani that he was working with Kürsch on material for a new Demons & Wizards album.

Demons & Wizards have confirmed that they will be playing at the Hellfest festival in June 2019, at the Wacken Open Air festival in August 2019, will headline ProgPower USA in September 2019  and they began their first North American tour in August 2019.

In December 2019, the band announced their third studio album, III. It was released on February 21, 2020. The album was cited as one of Paul Stenning's albums of the year for Brave Words.

Disbandment 
On January 6, 2021, guitarist Jon Schaffer was photographed among the protesters who stormed and ransacked the U.S. Capitol building in Washington, D.C. After appearing on the Most Wanted section of the FBI's website, Schaffer turned himself in on January 17 and was held on six felony charges. Century Media dropped the band from their roster two days after Jon Schaffer turned himself in. On February 1, 2021, it was announced that vocalist Hansi Kürsch left the band, stating his collaboration with Jon Schaffer is over.

Members

Last known lineup
Jon Schaffer – rhythm guitar, bass (studio)
Hansi Kürsch – vocals

Live members
Jake Dreyer – lead guitar
Marcus Siepen – guitar
Frederik Ehmke – drums
Joost Van Den Broek – keyboards

Former live/session members
Mark Prator – drums
Richard Christy – drums
Howard Helm – backing vocals, piano
Kathy Helm – backing vocals
Tori Fuson – backing vocals
Jesse Morrison – backing vocals
Krystyna Kolaczynski – cello
Ritchie Wilkison – lead guitar
Bobby Jarzombek – drums
Rubin Drake – bass
Jim Morris – lead guitar
Brent Smedley – drums

Discography
Demons & Wizards (2000)
Touched by the Crimson King (2005)
III (2020)

See also
Blind Guardian
Iced Earth

References

External links
SPV Records
 Interview dating from 2005
Demons & Wizards at Metal Storm

American power metal musical groups
German power metal musical groups
Musical groups established in 1998
Musical groups disestablished in 2021
Heavy metal supergroups